Ramses Lonlack (born 20 January 1989) is a Cameroonian women's basketball guard. She has played internationally with the Cameroon women's national basketball team and at the collegiate level with the Memphis Tigers women's basketball team in Tennessee, United States. 

Lonlack was born in Belabo, Cameroon and is a native of Bertoua. She moved to the United States in 2006 at the age of 17. Lonlack was a star player while attending Stoneleigh-Burnham School in Massachusetts, USA. During her senior season (2011-12) at Memphis, Lonlack was named the Conference USA Defensive Player of the Year. She was also named to the C-USA All-Defensive Team following her sophomore and junior seasons.

Memphis statistics

Source

References

1989 births
Living people
Cameroonian women's basketball players
Cameroonian expatriate basketball people in the United States
Memphis Tigers women's basketball players
Guards (basketball)
People from Bertoua